The Moon has been divided into 30 quadrangles by the United States Geological Survey at the 1:2,500,000 map scale. At the 1:1,000,000 scale it's divided into 144 quadrangles.

The quadrangles are numbered in bands from north to south.  Each band is then divided into a latitude-dependent number of quadrangles.  At the poles, the bands consist of a single quadrangle, so LQ01 is a circle around the north pole.

At the 1:1,000,000 scale, there are 12 latitude bands, 6 in each hemisphere.  The bands nearest the equator are 16° high, and the first and last bands are 10° radius circles around the poles.  The bands are then divided into quadrangles, but unlike the 1:2,500,000 system, the seam is placed at +10° longitude (so 0° longitude is in the middle of a quadrangle), and the numbering within a band starts between −80° and −90°:
 (±90° to ±80°) 1 quadrangle of 360°, beginning at −80°
 (±80° to ±64°) 8 quadrangles of 45°, beginning at −80°
 (±64° to ±48°) 12 quadrangles of 30°, beginning at −80°
 (±48° to ±32°) 15 quadrangles of 24°, beginning at −86°
 (±32° to ±16°) 18 quadrangles of 20°, beginning at −90°
 (±16° to 0°) 18 quadrangles of 20°, beginning at −90°

See also 
 List of quadrangles on Mercury
 List of quadrangles on Venus
 List of quadrangles on Mars

References 

Quadrangles